Noel John Francisco (born August 21, 1969) is an American lawyer who served as Solicitor General of the United States from 2017 to 2020. He was the first Asian American confirmed by the United States Senate to hold the position.

As Solicitor General, he was characterized as a staunch defender of President Trump. In his position, Francisco sought to have the Patient Protection and Affordable Care Act and Deferred Action for Childhood Arrivals struck down by the courts. He also defended Executive Order 13769, which was a ban on travelers from predominantly Muslim countries. Francisco also successfully defended the Trump administration's orders restricting travel from countries deemed to present security risks in Trump v. Hawaii, generating controversies.

Early life and education

Francisco was born in Syracuse, New York, the son of Nemesio and Therese Francisco. Therese was originally from Oswego, New York, and Nemesio immigrated from the Philippines to study medicine and became a doctor in Oswego.

Francisco was raised in Oswego and graduated from Oswego High School. He attended Brandeis University for one year, before transferring to the University of Chicago, where he majored in economics and earned a Bachelor of Arts degree with honors in 1991. In 1996, he earned a Juris Doctor degree with high honors from the University of Chicago Law School.

Career 
After law school, Francisco served as a law clerk for Judge J. Michael Luttig of the United States Court of Appeals for the Fourth Circuit from 1996 to 1997, and then clerked for Associate Justice Antonin Scalia of the Supreme Court of the United States from 1997 to 1998.

Francisco began his legal career at Cooper, Carvin, & Rosenthal, now known as Cooper & Kirk. He was part of the legal team that worked for George W. Bush on the Florida recount in the 2000 presidential election.

In 2001, Francisco was appointed as an Associate Counsel to President Bush in the Office of Counsel to the President. He later moved to the Office of Legal Counsel for the Deputy Assistant Attorney General in the United States Department of Justice, serving in that capacity from 2003 until 2005.

In 2005, Francisco moved back to the private sector, joining the Washington, D.C. office of the law firm Jones Day, eventually becoming the chair of the firm's government regulation practice. While at Jones Day, he appeared several times before the Supreme Court, including in McDonnell v. United States, which involved the meaning of "official act" under federal bribery statutes; Zubik v. Burwell, which involved the application of the Religious Freedom Restoration Act to regulations related to insurance coverage for contraception; and NLRB v. Noel Canning, which involved the Constitution’s recess appointment power. He also argued numerous cases in the lower federal and state courts on a wide range of constitutional, civil, and criminal matters.

Trump administration 
Francisco left Jones Day when he was appointed by President Donald Trump to the position of Principal Deputy Solicitor General for the United States, effective January 23, 2017. He served as the Acting Solicitor General from that date until March 10, 2017. On March 7, 2017, the White House announced Francisco's nomination to the position of Solicitor General. He was confirmed by the U.S. Senate by a vote of 50–47 on September 19, 2017, and was sworn in later that day.

With the resignation of Rachel Brand as Associate Attorney General on February 8, 2018, Francisco became the fourth-ranking official in the Justice Department. Francisco received an ethics waiver on April 24, 2018, which relieved him of a previous obligation to recuse himself from any investigation in which his former employer, law firm Jones Day, was involved. Jones Day, which owed Francisco approximately $500,000, represented the Trump presidential campaign in the Special Counsel investigation.

On June 17, 2020, Francisco announced that he would be leaving his post at the Department of Justice, effective July 3, 2020. In his three years as United States Solicitor General, Francisco had represented the United States government in over 150 merit cases, and personally argued in 17.

As Solicitor General, Francisco has been characterized as an "aggressive defender" of Trump. As Solicitor General, Francisco sought to have the Affordable Care Act (Obamacare) and the Deferred Action for Childhood Arrivals (DACA) struck down. He defended Trump's travel ban, which barred people from seven majority-Muslim countries. He sought to prevent Congress from accessing a redacted version of Special Counsel Robert Mueller's report into Russian interference in the 2016 election. He defended the Justice Department's decision to withdraw a case against Trump associate Michael Flynn even after Flynn had pleaded guilty. He fought against a subpoena to turn over Trump's tax records to the Manhattan district attorney.

Personal life 

Francisco is married with two daughters and resides in Washington, D.C. He previously served on the board of directors of the Chicago-based Lumen Christi Institute.

Selected publications and lectures 

 Francisco, Noel; Burnham, James (May 2013). "Noel Canning v. NLRB—Enforcing Basic Constitutional Limits on Presidential Power". Virginia L. Rev.. 99(1):17–29. Retrieved January 29, 2019.
 Francisco, Noel J.; Burnham, James M. (October 3, 2016). "Time for a New Pleading Standard in Criminal Cases". Forbes. Retrieved January 29, 2019.
 Francisco, Noel; Cruz, Ted (October 30, 2007). Audio: "Ted Cruz and Noel Francisco on Medellin v. Texas". University of Chicago Law School. University of Chicago chapter of the Federalist Society. Retrieved January 29, 2019.

See also 
 List of law clerks of the Supreme Court of the United States (Seat 9)
 Mueller special counsel investigation
 Donald Trump Supreme Court candidates

References

External links 
 Cases argued before the U.S. Supreme Court. Oyez.com.
 

|-

1969 births
Living people
20th-century American lawyers
21st-century American lawyers
American jurists of Filipino descent
American politicians of Filipino descent
Federalist Society members
George W. Bush administration personnel
Jones Day people
Law clerks of the Supreme Court of the United States
Lawyers from Washington, D.C.
New York (state) Republicans
People from Oswego, New York
Trump administration personnel
American scholars of constitutional law
United States Department of Justice lawyers
United States Solicitors General
University of Chicago Law School alumni
Washington, D.C., Republicans
Law clerks of J. Michael Luttig
Asian conservatism in the United States